The Frontier Force Regiment of the Pakistan Army consists of battalions with their own history. Most were formed after independence, but some are much older.

They are known as Piffers in reference to the former Punjab Irregular Force (PIF) formed by the British in 1851. The PIF consisted of five regiments of cavalry, eleven regiments of infantry and five batteries of artillery besides the Corps of Guides. Their mission was to maintain order on the Punjab Frontier. Most of them were allotted to Pakistan at the time of the independence of Pakistan. Only the 5th Gorkha Rifles (Frontier Force), and the 2nd Derajat and 4th (Hazara) Mountain Batteries went to India. The present Piffers include the Frontier Force Regiment, seven armoured regiments and The First (SP) Medium Regiment Artillery of Pakistan Army.

Frontier Force Regiment Battalions
Since formation in 1956, the battalions have been known officially by their ordinal number followed by the legend "FF". However, since many of the original fifteen battalions were from prior regiments, they were raised under different names, which are indicated. In some cases the battalion may be better known by the original name or nickname. 2 FF for instance is known better as "Guides Infantry" after the fact it was drawn from the infantry component of the Corps of Guides when that unit was disbanded. 11 FF was “1 Pathan” and members of 15 FF, still call their battalion, "2 Pathan" which was the designation the battalion had as a unit of the Pathan Regiment.

Affiliated units
These units are separate from but linked to the Frontier Force Regiment.

Footnotes

See also
 Punjab Irregular Force
 Frontier Force Regiment

Frontier Force Regiment